Dollars & Sense is a magazine focusing on economics from a progressive perspective, published by Dollars & Sense, Inc, which also publishes textbooks in the same genre.

Dollars & Sense describes itself as publishing "economic news and analysis, reports on economic justice activism, primers on economic topics, and critiques of the mainstream media's coverage of the economy."

Published since 1974 (it was originally a monthly; now it is bimonthly), it is edited by a collective of economists, journalists, and activists committed to the ideals of social justice and economic democracy.

It was initially sponsored by the Union for Radical Political Economics, but it is no longer affiliated with that organization. Today, the magazine is published by the independent Economic Affairs Bureau, Inc., a 501(c)3 non-profit corporation based in Boston, Massachusetts. Circulation is about 7,000.

The magazine is aimed at academics, students, and activists in the economic justice, social justice and labor movements.

References

External links 

Dollars and Sense records, 1974-1997, University Archives and Special Collections, Joseph P. Healey Library, University of Massachusetts Boston

1974 establishments in Massachusetts
Bimonthly magazines published in the United States
Business magazines published in the United States
Monthly magazines published in the United States
Political magazines published in the United States
Magazines established in 1974
Magazines published in Boston
Publishing collectives
Worker cooperatives of the United States